Ian Peak is a peak in the Bowers Mountains of Antarctica,  northwest of Mount Stirling where the feature overlooks the heads of Leap Year Glacier and Champness Glacier. It was named by the New Zealand Geological Survey Antarctic Expedition, 1967–68, for Ian Smith of the Victoria University of Wellington, a geologist in Antarctica that season. The mountain lies situated on the Pennell Coast, a portion of Antarctica lying between Cape Williams and Cape Adare.

References

Mountains of Victoria Land
Pennell Coast
1967 in Antarctica
1968 in Antarctica